Thomas Barker (15 November 1798 – 2 March 1877) was an English professional cricketer, who played first-class cricket from 1826 to 1845.  He was a right-handed batsman and a roundarm fast bowler.  He became an umpire when his playing career ended.

Barker was born in Carlton, Nottinghamshire. He was a member of the former Nottingham Cricket Club which evolved into Nottinghamshire County Cricket Club during his career and he was mainly associated with these two clubs.  He also played for Marylebone Cricket Club (MCC) and he represented the Players in the Gentlemen v Players fixture.  He bowled at an extremely fast pace, using a roundarm action.  William Denison wrote of his style: "So violent was it, that he sometimes ran up to the crease and propelled his instrument of attack as though his head would follow the ball."

Barker made 72 known appearances in first-class cricket.  He scored 1269 runs at 10.57 with a highest score of 58, that being his sole half-century.  He took 34 catches.  His bowling statistics are incomplete because for much of his career, bowlers were not credited with wickets falling to catches.  Even so, he averaged nearly three wickets per match, with 210 known wickets at 14.77 with a best performance of seven in an innings.  He took ten wickets in a match four times.

In 1843, Barker was badly injured in an accident involving a horse-drawn cab in London.  As a result, he had to stop playing in 1845 and was engaged by the MCC as an umpire.  He stood in 70 first-class matches until 1865.  During the winter months, he worked in Nottingham as a stockinger.

He died in Nottingham, aged 78.

References

1798 births
1877 deaths
English cricketers
English cricketers of 1826 to 1863
Hampshire cricketers
Marylebone Cricket Club cricketers
Midland Counties cricketers
Non-international England cricketers
North v South cricketers
Nottingham Cricket Club cricketers
Nottinghamshire cricketers
Players cricketers
Players of Nottinghamshire cricketers
Yorkshire cricketers
People from Carlton, Nottinghamshire
Cricketers from Nottinghamshire